The brown-cheeked laughingthrush (Trochalopteron henrici) is a species of bird in the family Leiothrichidae. It is found in south-western China and north-eastern India.

The specific name of this bird commemorates Prince Henri of Orléans.

References

brown-cheeked laughingthrush
Birds of Tibet
brown-cheeked laughingthrush
Taxonomy articles created by Polbot